Francesca Pasquini (born 27 December 1981) is an Italian-born French politician from EELV. She became the Member of Parliament for Hauts-de-Seine's 2nd constituency in the 2022 French legislative election.

References

See also 

 List of deputies of the 16th National Assembly of France

Living people
1981 births
Deputies of the 16th National Assembly of the French Fifth Republic
21st-century French women politicians
21st-century French politicians
Europe Ecology – The Greens politicians
Women members of the National Assembly (France)
Italian emigrants to France
French people of Italian descent
Members of Parliament for Hauts-de-Seine